Brian Ackley (born September 27, 1986) is an American soccer player who previously played for Wilmington Hammerheads.

Career
Ackley signed with Carolina RailHawks in February 2012.

References

External links
 Indiana Hoosiers bio

1986 births
Living people
American expatriate soccer players
Indiana Hoosiers men's soccer players
North Carolina FC U23 players
Cary Clarets players
Auckland City FC players
Team Wellington players
1. FK Příbram players
Reading United A.C. players
Penn FC players
North Carolina FC players
Wilmington Hammerheads FC players
USL League Two players
USL Championship players
North American Soccer League players
Soccer players from North Carolina
Expatriate association footballers in New Zealand
Expatriate footballers in the Czech Republic
American soccer players
Athens Drive High School alumni
Association football forwards
American expatriate sportspeople in New Zealand
American expatriate sportspeople in the Czech Republic